Belgrade Tower, officially known as Kula Belgrade, is a 42-floor,  tall mixed-use skyscraper currently under construction in the Belgrade Waterfront project in Belgrade, Serbia.

Upon completion of the outer structure in 2022, it became the tallest building in Belgrade, Serbia and the western Balkans region and has been promoted as "the beacon of the entire master-planned community."

Overview 
Situated in a prime location at the bank of the Sava River, the Belgrade Tower will offer a waterfront lifestyle. Intended as a "new symbol of the Serbian capital," the developers aimed to integrate Belgrade's traditional architecture in a modern development. The tower will have a direct approach to a waterfront promenade, located in close proximity to Belgrade Fortress. It will be connected with the old city through a public plaza.

The architects were inspired by the nearby river when planning the exterior appearance. Aside from the Avala telecommunications tower, this will be the tallest structure in Belgrade, including a 190-room St. Regis hotel occupying the first nine floors, and 220 luxury St. Regis-branded and serviced apartments on floors 14 through 39. Guests of the St. Regis Belgrade and residents of the apartments will have access to a swimming pool, gym, a relaxation lounge and an observation deck at the top of the tower.

References

Belgrade Waterfront
Skyscrapers in Serbia
Towers in Serbia
Residential skyscrapers
Skyscraper hotels
Buildings and structures in Belgrade
Savski Venac